QEC may refer to:

Quantum error correction
 , two aircraft carriers of the United Kingdom's Royal Navy
Electoral Commission of Queensland
Queen Elizabeth College
 Queen Elizabeth College, London, UK
 Queen Elizabeth College, Palmerston North, New Zealand
 Queen Elizabeth College, Mauritius
 Queen Elizabeth Centre, Ballarat
 Qulliq Energy Corporation